Polar Research and Policy Initiative, commonly known as PRPI or The Polar Connection, is an independent, international foreign policy think tank dedicated primarily to the Arctic, Nordic, Baltic and Antarctic regions, as well as energy and environment issues. PRPI is headquartered in London, United Kingdom, and has an international presence across North America, Europe and the Asia-Pacific, notably through the geographic distribution of its Fellows, Advisors and Affiliates. PRPI operates principally in the international arena and is committed to supporting sustainable regional development through multi-stakeholder, multi-sectoral and multi-national dialogue and cooperation.

History

Background 

In 2015–16, the Arctic Council marked its 20th anniversary; the Arctic Economic Council opened its secretariat in Tromsø and adopted its foundational documents; and the Parties to the Antarctic Treaty within the Antarctic Treaty System celebrated the 25th anniversary of the Protocol on Environmental Protection to the Antarctic Treaty that set aside Antarctica as a "natural reserve, devoted to peace and science". Within the United Kingdom itself, the Polar Regions continued to elicit considerable interest, with the ongoing commemoration of the centenary of Sir Ernest Shackleton's Imperial Trans-Antarctic Expedition of 2014-2017 and the online poll by the Natural Environment Research Council for a name for the newly commissioned Royal Research Ship that saw Boaty McBoatface emerge as the most popular suggestion before it was named RRS Sir David Attenborough. December 2015 also witnessed the historic Paris Agreement reached by 195 government delegations at the 2015 United Nations Climate Change Conference in Paris.

Founding 

Polar Research and Policy Initiative was founded by Dr Dwayne Ryan Menezes and Mr Christophe Milhères in 2015-2016 as the UK's first policy think-tank dedicated primarily to the Arctic and the Antarctic. It was incorporated in England and Wales in September 2015, six months after their return from Greenland, and launched in February 2016 at a private reception held at the Travellers Club in London, with Aleqa Hammond, the former Prime Minister of Greenland, and Andrew Rosindell, Member of Parliament (MP) for Romford and Founder and former Chair of the All-Party Parliamentary Group on Polar Regions, as speakers. Among the attendees were Kamalesh Sharma, Commonwealth Secretary-General; Captain Ashok Mahapatra, Director of the Maritime Safety Division of the International Maritime Organization; Stefan Asmundssen, President of the North East Atlantic Fisheries Commission; Donald Lamont, Chairman of the UK Antarctic Heritage Trust and former Governor of the Falkland Islands and Commissioner of South Georgia and the South Sandwich Islands; and Jock Wishart, polar explorer. Its web portal Polar Connection was launched thereafter in July 2016.

Current Status 

The mission of PRPI, as stated on its website, is "to:
 raise the profile and understanding of the Polar Regions in the UK and across the Commonwealth;
 support polar researchers and polar research institutions in maximising the visibility, impact and reach of their research;
 increase and sustain the scholarly, cultural, political and commercial engagement of the UK and relevant Commonwealth member states with the Polar Regions (especially the Arctic Council member states);
 help address some of the toughest political, social, economic and environmental challenges facing polar peoples and places;
 facilitate greater bilateral trade and investment between Arctic states and Commonwealth member states."

Over the past two years, its focus has gradually expanded: while PRPI had a very clear UK and Commonwealth of Nations focus at the start, this has expanded to include, over the first six months, the United States and, after the 2016 United Kingdom European Union membership referendum (popularly known as Brexit), the rest of Europe. Currently, it positions itself as a UK-based international think-tank that operates principally in the international arena. Furthermore, at the time of its inception, PRPI engaged with different geographic constituencies through four engagement forums, dealing with the Asia Pacific, European Union, Small Island Developing States and World Ocean respectively. Following the 2016 Arctic Circle Assembly, it also introduced a new BRICS engagement forum.

Activities 

Since its inception, PRPI's most defining features have been the provision of research, analysis and commentary; high-level engagement with policymakers, industry leaders, academics and Indigenous representatives; ongoing dialogue with national governments and multilateral fora; and active participation at national and international conferences. It has also aligned its principal activities with the key priorities of the incumbent Chairs of the Arctic Council: the United States, 2015–2017, on "improving economic and living conditions in Arctic communities"; and Finland, 2017–2019, in "exploring[ing] how the Agenda 2030 framework [2030 Agenda for Sustainable Development] can be used in Arctic cooperation for the benefit of humans and nature".

Research, Analysis and Commentary 

PRPI publishes its research and provides analysis and commentary both via its digital platform Polar Connection (www.polarconnection.org) and through partner platforms such as Arctic Today and other national and international media outlets. PRPI Fellows also make their research available through monographs, book chapters in edited volumes and research papers in journals. Its research interests are reflected in its organisational structure, which features three divisions: theme-specific units; industry-specific units; and stakeholder engagement forums.

Theme-specific Units 

PRPI has six theme-specific units:
 Natural Environment 
 Marine Environment 
 Built Environment
 Indigenous Peoples 
 Arts, Culture and Heritage 
 Geopolitics and Security

Industry-specific Units 

PRPI has six industry-specific units:
 Energy 
 Mining 
 Shipping
 Fisheries 
 Tourism 
 Information and communications technology

Engagement Forums 

PRPI engages with different geopolitical constituencies through five engagement forums: 
 Asia Pacific 
 European Union 
 Small Island Developing States
 World Ocean 
 BRICS

Stakeholder Engagement 

PRPI positions itself as the nexus between stakeholders in policy, industry, academia, civil society and the media, and it provides a platform for dialogue and cooperation between different stakeholders. It does so in a variety of ways:

Parliamentary Evidence, Policy Briefs and Industry Briefs 

PRPI has regularly provided written and oral evidence to relevant UK Parliamentary inquiries, such as:

 UK House of Commons Business, Energy and Industrial Strategy Committee, 'Leaving the EU: Negotiating Priorities for Energy and Climate Change Policy Inquiry';
 UK House of Commons Scottish Affairs Committee, 'Scotland and the High North Inquiry';
 UK House of Commons Science and Technology Committee, 'Closing the STEM Skills Gap Inquiry';
 UK House of Commons International Trade Committee, 'UK Trade Options Beyond 2019 Inquiry'.
PRPI also provides policy briefs and industry briefs, when requested, to policymakers and industry leaders.

Missions and Delegations 

PRPI also sends missions or delegations to brief national governments and intergovernmental bodies about various Arctic, Nordic and Antarctic issues or the ongoing work of PRPI. In September 2016, its founder, Dr Dwayne Menezes, represented PRPI at the United Nations General Assembly and was invited to attend the UN Paris Climate Change Agreement Ratification Ceremony in New York City as a Civil Society Observer. In its early years, PRPI delegations were also received by the Executive Secretary of the Antarctic Treaty Secretariat in Buenos Aires; the Executive Office of the Secretary-General of the United Nations at the Headquarters of the United Nations in New York; the Office of Science and Technology Policy at the White House, the United States Department of State, the International Monetary Fund and the National Science Foundation in Washington, D.C.; the Foreign and Commonwealth Office in London; the Department of Foreign Affairs and Trade (Australia) in Canberra; Global Affairs Canada, Senate of Canada and Government of Newfoundland and Labrador; the Prime Minister's Office (Finland) and Ministry for Foreign Affairs (Finland) in Helsinki; the Ministry of Foreign Affairs (Denmark) in Copenhagen; the Ministry of Foreign Affairs (Iceland) in Reykjavik; among others.

Conferences 

With respect to conferences, PRPI has sent delegations to, or convened policy dialogues at, the Arctic Circle Assemblies organised by Arctic Circle (organization) in Reykjavik in October 2015, October 2016 and October 2017; the Arctic Circle Forums hosted by the same organisation in Edinburgh in November 2017 and Tórshavn in May 2018; the Arctic Encounter Symposia held in the margins of the 2015 United Nations Climate Change Conference in Paris in December 2015 and in Seattle in April 2018; the Arctic Spirit Conference hosted in Rovaniemi in November 2017; the Ramboll Arctic Roundtable in Portland, Maine in December 2016; the NERC Arctic Science Conference convened in Sheffield in September 2015 and Antarctic Science Conference in Norfolk in July 2016; the Antarctica 100 Annual Meeting at the Royal Geographical Society in London in November 2015; the Arctic Future Symposium hosted by the International Polar Foundation in Brussels in November 2015; and the Arctic Science Summit Week and Arctic Observing Summit held in Fairbanks in April 2016 and Davos in June 2018.

Policy Dialogues 

Annually, PRPI hosts 50-60 events around the world, ranging from lectures, panel discussions, roundtable discussions, workshops, conferences, policy breakfasts and dinners, and receptions for visiting dignitaries.

High-Level Dialogues on SDGs in the Arctic 

PRPI has been widely credited for ensuring the Sustainable Development Goals remain high on the policy agenda of Arctic Council member and observer governments, and for bringing about a re-articulation of the global Arctic discourse along the lines of the 17 Global Goals. It is particularly known for its high-level, multi-stakeholder dialogues on SDGs in the Arctic, which have been convened thus far at the Arctic Circle Assembly at Harpa (concert hall) in Reykjavik, Iceland, in October 2017; Lapland University of Applied Sciences in Rovaniemi, Finland, in November 2017; Trent University in Peterborough, Ontario, Canada, in December 2017; Australian Institute of International Affairs in Canberra, Australia, in January 2018; Palace of Westminster in London, United Kingdom, in February 2018; Fletcher School of Law and Diplomacy at Tufts University in Boston, United States, in March 2018; Arctic Encounter Symposium in Seattle, United States, in April 2018; University of Tromsø in Tromsø, Norway, in April 2018; Arctic Circle Forum in Tórshavn, Faroe Islands, in May 2018; and Jawaharlal Nehru University in New Delhi, India, in June 2018.

Dialogues on Arctic Border Governance 

In June 2017, PRPI co-hosted a workshop on 'Regional Security in the North: Emerging Themes and Challenges' in Whitehorse, Yukon, Canada, in collaboration with Trent University, Yukon College, Royal Military College of Canada, St. Jerome's University, the Consulate General of the United States in Toronto, Borders in Globalization and the Social Sciences and Humanities Research Council of Canada. At the workshop, David Johnny, former chief of the White River First Nation, highlighted the challenges posed by borders to indigenous communities, such as the Upper Tanana peoples, whose villages and dwellings were near the boundary or even straddled the line. Likewise, Dr Dalee Sambo Dorough, professor at University of Alaska Anchorage and former chair of the United Nations Permanent Forum on Indigenous Issues, discussed the difficulties faced by American and Canadian Inuit.

Two months later, in August 2017, PRPI, along with University College London (UCL), Trent University and the Social Sciences and Humanities Research Council of Canada, convened a follow-up interdisciplinary panel discussion on 'Arctic Borders Governance' at UCL in London, with Prof. Heather Nicol, Dr Ilan Kelman and Dr Dwayne Menezes as speakers. The discussion focused on the implications of borders on indigenous peoples in Arctic and sub-Arctic regions - particularly the Inuit in United States, Canada, Greenland and Russia; the Aleuts in Russia and the United States; the Gwich'in people in Canada and the United States; and the Sami people in Norway, Sweden, Finland and Russia. These discussions also formed the basis of the paper on 'Canada, Indigenous Peoples and Northern Borders' that Menezes published in The Round Table: The Commonwealth Journal of International Affairs in October 2017.

In December 2017, on behalf of PRPI and Trent University, Menezes and Nicol chaired a panel discussion on Arctic borders at the Erasmus+ - and SSHRC- funded Borders in Globalization 2nd International Conference held at the Lord Elgin Hotel in Ottawa, Ontario, Canada, with Canadian Senator Charlie Watt, historian P. Whitney Lackenbauer, lawyer Robin Campbell and Université de Montréal professor Suzanne Lalonde as speakers.

Dialogues on Arctic Transportation 

In June 2016, PRPI Fellow and UCL Researcher Domagoj Baresic presented his research at the International Conference on 'Maritime Actors and Climate Change: Incentives and Strategies for Voluntary Action' organised by the Transatlantic Maritime Emissions Research Network (TRAMEREN), a joint research venture between the Center for Enterprise Liability, Faculty of Law, University of Copenhagen and the Frank Guarini Center, School of Law, New York University, held in Copenhagen, Denmark. Acknowledging the challenges involved with developing a comprehensive international legal framework for controlling maritime greenhouse gas emissions, the conference examined some of the innovative, yet decentralised, approaches for incentivising maritime emissions controls, paying attention to the fragmented legal architecture governing the sector.

Following the adoption and implementation of a prohibition on the use and carriage of heavy fuel oil (HFO) by ships operating in the Antarctic, the Clean Arctic Alliance (CAA) has campaigned to establish similar environmental protection measures in the Arctic. In November 2017, PRPI joined forces with CAA in its efforts to introduce a HFO ban in the Arctic and co-hosted a panel discussion on 'Heavy Fuel Oil (HFO) Use in Arctic Shipping: Risks, Alternatives and Legal Options for a Phase-Out' at the 10th Polar Law Symposium in Rovaniemi, Finland, with support from the European Climate Foundation. At the event, PRPI became a signatory to the Arctic Commitment. In January 2018, PRPI also published a report by Dr Sian Prior of CAA and Liana James of the Clean Air Task Force about the progress made at the International Maritime Organization on a phase-out of the use of HFO as marine fuel in the Arctic, wherein they also laid out some of the measures which could be implemented to mitigate the risks associated with HFO use and the legal options available to ban HFO use in the Arctic altogether. Baresic also discussed his ongoing research on 'Sustainability Transitions in Arctic Maritime Transport' at the Arctic Circle Assembly in Reykjavik in October 2017 and the Arctic Circle Forum in Edinburgh in November 2017.

Alongside fuel use in Arctic shipping, the development of support infrastructure for safe, secure, effective and efficient Arctic transport has also been a research and policy priority for PRPI. In July 2017, PRPI organised a keynote lecture by PRPI Fisheries Head and University of Southern Denmark Professor Dr Brooks Kaiser on 'Arctic Ports: Local Community Development Issues' at Korea Polar Research Institute KOPRI in Incheon, South Korea. In November 2017, Baresic and Menezes also presented about Arctic maritime and coastal infrastructure at the 11th Arctic Shipping Summit in London. A number of subsequent PRPI 'SDGs in the Arctic' dialogues, such as those in Seattle and Tórshavn, also focused on Arctic transportation, with high-level speakers drawn from the Arctic Council, Ministry for Foreign Affairs (Finland), Alaska Airlines, Maine Port Authority, Maine Department of Transportation, United States Department of Transportation, U.S. Department of Homeland Security Homeland Security Centers of Excellence and the Danish Folketing. PRPI has also provided analysis and commentary on Arctic shipping to publications in the maritime domain.

Dialogues on Arctic Sealing 

In October 2017, PRPI and the Embassy of Canada in Iceland hosted a screening of the 2016 Canadian feature-length documentary film Angry Inuk at the 2017 Arctic Circle Assembly in Reykjavik, Iceland, followed by a Q&A session with the Inuk filmmaker Alethea Arnaquq-Baril. Canada's Minister of Crown-Indigenous Relations and Northern Affairs Carolyn Bennett, Canadian Ambassador to Iceland Dr Anne-Tamara Lorre and PRPI Director Dr Dwayne Menezes offered addresses, while Penny Goodman of Scott Polar Research Institute moderated the discussion with Arnaquq-Baril. The film presented a defence of the Inuit seal hunt in the face of the EU Ban on Seal Products. The film also set the stage for a panel discussion on 'Arctic Sealing: Threat or Blue Prospect?' convened the next day by the North Atlantic Marine Mammal Commission (NAMMCO), World Wide Fund for Nature (WWF) and Nunavut Tunngavik Incorporated in which Arnaquq-Baril and Menezes both sat on the panel. The panel also included NAMMCO General Secretary Genevieve Desportes, Makivik Corporation Vice-president Adamie Alaku, Aaja Chemnitz Larsen and Nordic Council senior adviser Geir Oddsson, among others.

Dialogues on British, Canadian and American Arctic Engagement 

In April 2017, PRPI Director Menezes visited Rovaniemi, Finland, where he highlighted the opportunities for trade and investment between the UK and the eight Arctic Council member states at Northern STARS, the annual international seminar of Lapin AMK - Lapland University of Applied Sciences. In October 2017, PRPI hosted a discussion on the same topic at the 2017 Arctic Circle Assembly in Reykjavik, Iceland.

Likewise, early in July 2017, in order to mark the 150th anniversary of Canada, PRPI convened a special 'Canada 150' lecture and reception with Canadian historian Ken Coates of the Johnson Shoyama Graduate School of Public Policy, University of Saskatchewan, at the Institute of Commonwealth Studies, School of Advanced Study, University of London. Later that year, in October 2017, PRPI hosted two keynote lectures by Tony Penikett, former Premier of Yukon, on 'Indigenous Chiefs, Regional Legislators, and Nation States: Who Rules the Arctic?' in the UK, the first with University College London (UCL) in London and the second with the University of Edinburgh in Edinburgh. In November 2017, PRPI and the Department of Political Science at University of Western Ontario (UWO or Western University) convened two keynote lectures by Elizabeth Riddell Dixon in London, Ontario, Canada, the first on 'Ice Camps and Icebreakers: The Challenges of Mapping the Arctic Seabed' at London Public Library and the second on 'Sovereignty and Canada's Arctic Extended Continental Shelf' at UWO.

In January 2018, PRPI hosted a keynote lecture by American publisher and philanthropist Alice Rogoff on 'The US and its Emerging Arctic Interest' at UCL in London, UK.

Other Dialogues 

In 2016, PRPI Geopolitics and Security Fellow Barbora Padrtova was part of a research team that supported the preparation of an Arctic Analysis Research Report at the behest of the Ministry of Foreign Affairs (Czech Republic). She discussed her work in this regard at the 2016 General Conference of the European Consortium for Political Research held at Charles University in Prague in July 2016, the Annual Meeting of the Austrian Polar Research Institute in Vienna in November 2016 and an Expert Seminar on 'The Arctic: Emerging Importance of the Region for the Czech Republic' held at the Institute of International Relations Prague in Prague in January 2017.

In July 2017, PRPI convened a keynote lecture by PRPI Fisheries Fellow Brooks Kaiser on 'A Case for the Commons: The Snow Crab in the Barents' at Korea Polar Research Institute KOPRI in Incheon, South Korea. In September 2017, PRPI Fellow Nic Craig presented on the 'Implications of Brexit on UK - Arctic Interconnection and the Continued Need for Cooperation' at the 2017 Arctic Energy Summit in Helsinki, Finland.

In October 2017, PRPI joined University College London in hosting a keynote lecture by Timo Koivurova of Arctic Centre, University of Lapland on 'How Finland, as Chair of the Arctic Council, aims to improve Arctic Governance' at UCL in London, UK.

In April 2018, PRPI Fellow Nic Craig presented on the issue of black carbon in the Arctic and policy and business opportunities to address these issues at North by North Festival in Anchorage, Alaska.

Governance

Managing Director 

Dr Dwayne Ryan Menezes

Advisory board

UK Advisory Board 

The members of the PRPI UK Advisory Board include:
 Gloria Hooper, Baroness Hooper, Member of the House of Lords
 Richard Balfe, Member of the House of Lords
 Andrew Rosindell, Member of Parliament for Romford (UK Parliament constituency)
 Angela Smith, Member of Parliament for Penistone and Stocksbridge (UK Parliament constituency)
 Angus MacNeil, Member of Parliament for Na h-Eileanan an Iar (UK Parliament constituency)
 Helen Goodman, Member of Parliament for Bishop Auckland (UK Parliament constituency)
 Admiral Sir James Perowne KBE, Constable and Governor of Windsor Castle; former Deputy Supreme Allied Commander Atlantic
 Rear Admiral Nick Lambert, former UK National Hydrographer, United Kingdom Hydrographic Office; Chairman of the Committee of the Friends of Scott Polar Research Institute
 Donald Lamont, Chairman of the UK Antarctic Heritage Trust; former Governor of the Falkland Islands and Commissioner for South Georgia and the South Sandwich Islands; former Chief Executive of Wilton Park
 Philippa Foster Back CBE, Chairman of the UK Antarctic Place-Names Committee; Chairman of the South Georgia Heritage Trust
 Professor Gisele Arruda, Oxford Brookes University
 Dr Ilan Kelman, University College London
 Dale Templar, Executive Producer, Human Planet (BBC One/Discovery Channel/BBC Worldwide)

International Advisory Board 

The members of the PRPI International Advisory Board include:
 Aleqa Hammond, former Prime Minister of Greenland
 Tero Vauraste, CEO of Arctia (company) and vice-chair of Arctic Economic Council
 Asmundur Gudjonsson, Director, The Nordic Atlantic Cooperation (NORA), Nordic Council
 Inuuteq Holm Olsen, Minister Plenipotentiary for Greenland, Embassy of Denmark in Washington, D.C.
 Alice Rogoff, Owner and Publisher, Arctic Today
 Mead Treadwell, former president, Pt Capital; former Lieutenantt Governor of Alaska
 Craig Fleener, Arctic Policy Adviser to Bill Walker, Governor of Alaska; former chair, Gwich'in Council International
 Reggie Joule, former Mayor of the Northwest Arctic Borough, Alaska and Member of the President of the United States State, Local and Tribal Leaders' Taskforce on Climate Preparedness and Resilience
 Rajendra K. Pachauri, former chairperson, Intergovernmental Panel on Climate Change
 Professor Lawrence Susskind, Director, MIT Science Impact Collaborative; Ford Professor of Urban and Environmental Planning, Massachusetts Institute of Technology; Co-founder, Program on Negotiation, Harvard Law School
 Professor Oran Young, Distinguished Professor Emeritus, Bren School of Environmental Science & Management, University of California, Santa Barbara
 Professor Timo Koivurova, Director, Arctic Centre, University of Lapland
 Professor Lassi Heininen, Professor, University of Lapland; chairman, Steering Committee, Northern Research Forum, University of the Arctic
 Professor Julia Jabour, Institute for Marine and Antarctic Studies, University of Tasmania
 Professor Rachael Lorna Johnstone, Professor, University of Akureyri
 Professor Maria Ackren, Head, Department of Social Sciences University of Greenland
 Embla Eir Oddsdottir, Director, Icelandic Arctic Cooperation Network
 Terzah Tippin Poe, Lecturer, Harvard University
 Nils Arne Johnsen, Founder and Principal, Haleyg AS; former International Arctic Director, Ramboll
 Richard Brosseau, Director - Public Affairs and Community Relations, Stolt LNGaz; former Senior Special Adviser, Premier of Quebec
 Linda V. Priebe, Partner, Culhane Meadows PLLC; Vice-president, Norwegian American Chamber of Commerce Mid-Atlantic Chapter Board; former Deputy General Counsel and Ethics Official, White House Offices under three US Presidential Administrations
 Stéphanie & Jérémie Gicquel, lawyers, polar explorers

References

Think tanks
2010s in the United Kingdom
2016 in the United Kingdom
2016 establishments in the United Kingdom
Organisations based in the London Borough of Camden
Organizations established in 2016
British companies established in 2016
Think tanks based in the United Kingdom
Foreign policy and strategy think tanks
Foreign policy and strategy think tanks in Europe
Foreign policy and strategy think tanks based in the United Kingdom
Science and technology think tanks based in the United Kingdom
Foreign policy
International relations
21st century in international relations
2016 in international relations
Antarctic research